LegalShield (previously known as Pre-Paid Legal Services or simply Pre-Paid Legal) is an American corporation that sells legal service products direct to consumer through employer groups and through multi-level marketing in the United States, and Canada. It was available in the United Kingdom from 2019 to 2021. According to LegalShield's income disclosure regarding associates selling the product:  "For Associates with 0-2 years of experience who made at least one sale, average annual earnings were $798 for 2019. Approximately 73% of all Associates across experience years made less than $1,000 in 2019."

The company was founded in 1972, as the Sportsman's Motor Club. In 1976, it was incorporated as Pre-Paid Legal Services, Inc., and made its initial public offering in 1984.

In 2011, Pre-Paid Legal went from being traded on the New York Stock Exchange back to being a private company when it was acquired by MidOcean Partners and subsequently changed its name to LegalShield.

Services 
LegalShield develops and markets pre-paid legal service plans through a network of more than 6,900 independent provider attorneys across the U.S. and Canada. The company also markets IDShield, a privacy and reputation management service that also provides identity theft monitoring and restoration. The company's membership plans are sold as employee benefits, through its multi-level marketing division, and direct to consumers.

History

Sportsman's Motor Club
LegalShield started as Sportsman's Motor Club in 1972 in Ada, Oklahoma. Harland Stonecipher (1938–2014) was the company's founding president and chief executive officer (CEO). The life insurance salesman from Ada, Oklahoma, created the "motor service club" after being in a car accident in 1969. The other party in the crash was cited for fault but still filed suit against Stonecipher for the accident. Although he had health, life, and vehicle insurance coverage, he was required to hire a lawyer to defend himself in court and struggled to pay the legal expenses. After researching the industry of European legal expense plans, he established the Sportsman's Motor Club to reimburse members for legal fees relating to vehicle accidents.

Pre-Paid Legal Services
The club changed its name and incorporated as Pre-Paid Legal Services, Inc. in 1976, becoming the first company in the United States to provide pre-paid legal plans for individuals. Initially, members could choose their own lawyer and seek reimbursement from Pre-Paid, but by the 1980s, the company directed members needing legal help to pre-selected firms.

Pre-Paid Legal went public in 1984. Pre-Paid was first listed on the NASDAQ, then moved to the American Stock Exchange in 1986, followed by the New York Stock Exchange in 1999, where it was listed as "PPD".

In 1998 Pre-Paid acquired The People's Network, a marketing company based in Dallas.

In 1999 the company began offering plans in Canada in 1999, with some modifications to suit the Canadian legal system. By 2009, it covered 28,000 Canadian families across four provinces.

In 2000 Pre-Paid Legal was criticised by CBC's Marketplace for operating as a multi-level marketing model and encouraging sales associates to buy training material.

In 2003, the company moved into a new corporate headquarters in Ada, Oklahoma.

In November 2006, Pre-Paid announced plans to spend $27.4 million to repurchase shares owned by executives.

In 2010, Stonecipher resigned from the positions of president and CEO. Randy Harp and Mark Brown were appointed as co-CEOs, with Harp assuming the role of company president. Stonecipher retained his position as chairman of the company's board.

Controversies
In 2001, a Wyoming attorney general announced, "When we discovered that Pre-Paid was using prohibited income representations to promote their multilevel marketing program, we warned them that the representations were prohibited by Wyoming law." Pre-Paid denied violating the law, but agreed to adjust its marketing messaging and pay $7,000, including $2,000 refunded to participants who alleged the company had misled them. In the same year, the U.S. Securities and Exchange Commission (SEC) required Pre-Paid to stop counting the commissions paid out to sales associates as assets instead of expenses, which reduced reported earnings by over half. As a result, Pre-Paid amended its reporting and filed its 2000 financial statements in February 2002. The statements showed huge decreases in earnings (from $43.6 million to $20.5 million) and stockholder equity (from $147 million to $42 million). Later that year, however, the Denver Business Journal reported that Pre-Paid earned a $27.1 million profit on $303.7 million in revenue, a large increase from its $1.9 million profit on revenues of $129.6 million in 1997, and its members had access to a network of 46 firms with 1,270 lawyers.

In 2004, approximately 250 plaintiffs filed about 30 lawsuits in Alabama against Pre-Paid, all of which were dismissed or settled by 2006. Pre-Paid faced two lawsuits in Mississippi, one in October 2004, and the other in February 2005. A jury ruled in favor of the company in the first suit. In the second, a jury found Pre-Paid and Stonecipher guilty of deceptive advertising and fraud and required them, in November 2005, to pay $9.9 million in punitive damages. TheStreet.com reported that Pre-Paid faced additional lawsuits filed by 400 Mississippi plaintiffs which were ultimately settled. TheStreet.com also noted that the company had had some success in court, including the overturning of a fraud verdict and the defeat of a class action lawsuit alleging the company was a pyramid scheme. The company and the U.S. Chamber of Commerce, which had Stonecipher on its board of directors, called the lawsuits "frivolous" and "abusive".

Pre-Paid's independent auditor was unable to approve the company's 2004 financial statements because of "material weaknesses" related to the processing of commissions. Two weeks later, Pre-Paid filed 2004 financial statements approved by its auditor, Grant Thornton. New rules proposed by the Federal Trade Commission (FTC) required Pre-Paid to disclose to potential associates that less than 25 percent of its sales representatives sold multiple insurance plans in 2005, which the company confirmed in an SEC filing.

In 2007, the FTC began investigating Pre-Paid's marketing of its identity theft service and Affirmative Defense Response System (ADRS), which the company developed to increase group sales. Pre-Paid changed its marketing materials in 2009 after regulators found the company's claims about ADRS misleading. According to an SEC filing, the FTC and Pre-Paid "[reached] a mutually agreeable solution", and in 2010 the agency ended its three-year investigation without any action.

PrePaid was the top corporate donor to the 2008 re-election campaign for Utah Attorney General Mark Shurtleff, who has defended the operation of multi-level marketing firms in that state.

LegalShield
In January 2011, Pre-Paid Legal agreed to be bought out for $650 million USD with entities formed by MidOcean Partners, a New York private equity firm that describes itself as "focused on the middle market". The deal closed on June 30, 2011, and the company once again became privately held. In July 2011, Rip Mason began serving as LegalShield's CEO. In late 2011, the company changed its name to LegalShield as part of an overall re-branding initiative.

In July 2014, Jeff Bell replaced Mason as CEO, and Mason became chairman of the board. He retired in 2022.

Stone Point Capital, another private equity firm, purchased a majority stake in LegalShield from MidOcean Partners in 2018. In 2019, the company expanded into the UK with offices in Oxford and an arrangement with Slater & Gordon UK providing legal advice via the LegalDefence app. The venture in the UK went into liquidation in May 2021.

References

External links
 
  Prepaid Legal to Merge with MidOcean Partners, Acquisition for $650 Million July 2011
 CBC News Report on PPL
  Pre-Paid Weathers Guilty Verdict
 Pre-Paid Legal's Colorful Workforce
  Attorney General’s Office Nets Refunds From  Multi-Level  Marketer

Companies based in Oklahoma
Financial services companies established in 1972
Criminal defense organizations
Multi-level marketing companies
Insurance companies of the United States
Privately held companies based in Oklahoma
Ada, Oklahoma
1972 establishments in Oklahoma